The First Dance is the debut studio album by the indie folk band Bridezilla.

Release
The album was released on 6 November 2009 in Australia. There are fourteen tracks on the album, with a fifteenth bonus track available on iTunes. It was produced and engineered by Kramer (musician).

Track listing

Critical reception

The album has garnered mostly positive reviews. The AU Review talks of their unique sound – "a sultry mix of folk inspired rock and roll, The First Dance is gentle but strong, holding an understated power, a subtle strength that many bands lack".  Mac Easton at Soulshine speaks favourably, "The First Dance is a musical moment to be absolutely savoured." "The album – anything but raucous – lures the listener to the same state felt on a relaxed yet contemplative summer's afternoon," says Drone Magazine.

Personnel
Holiday Sidewinder – Vocals, Guitar
Pia May – Guitar
Josh Bush – Drums
Millie Hall – Saxophone, Keyboards
Daisy Tulley – Violin

References

Bridezilla (band) albums
2009 albums
Inertia (independent record company) albums